Christopher C. Rodriguez (born May 10, 1976) is an American college baseball coach and former catcher. He is the head baseball coach at the University of the Pacific. Rodridguez played college baseball at Modesto Junior College from 1995 to 1996 before pursuing a professional career from 1996 to 1997. He was the head baseball coach at Modesto Junior College from 2009 to 2012.

Playing career
After graduation from high school, Rodriguez choose to attend Modesto Junior College. After two seasons at Modesto, Rodriguez was drafted in the 52nd round of the 1996 Major League Baseball draft by the Colorado Rockies. Rodriguez began his professional career with the Arizona League Rockies of the rookie league Arizona League, where he batted .173 with six runs batted in. The next year, Rodriguez started the year with the Asheville Tourists of the Class A South Atlantic League, where he would play two games before being demoted to the Portland Rockies, where he batted .264, helping the Rockies to a Northwest League championship.

Coaching career
On October 26, 2018, Rodriguez joined Ryan Garko's staff at the University of the Pacific.

On January 8, 2020, Rodriguez was promoted to interim head coach when Garko left the school to take a job with the Los Angeles Angels. On June 5, 2020, the University of Pacific removed the interim tag, officially naming Rodriguez the 19th head baseball coach in school history.

Head coaching record

See also
 List of current NCAA Division I baseball coaches

References

External links

Pacific Tigers bio

Living people
1976 births
Baseball catchers
Modesto Pirates baseball players
Arizona League Rockies players
Portland Rockies players
Asheville Tourists players
Modesto Pirates baseball coaches
Delta College Mustangs baseball coaches
Pacific Tigers baseball coaches
People from West Covina, California
Sportspeople from Los Angeles County, California
Baseball players from California
Baseball coaches from California